Four Pillars or four pillars may refer to:

Politics and government
Four pillars policy, to keep Australia's four largest banks separate
Four Pillars of Nepal Bhasa, four people who campaign to revive the language and literature
Four Pillars of Transnistria, basis of the declaration of independence of a separatist region in Moldova in Eastern Europe
The four pillars of green politics
The  four pillars of communication rights

Science, technology and mathematics
Four Pillars (Geneva Association), an economic policy research programme
Four pillars of manufacturing engineering, devised by the American SME
Four Pillars of Geometry, a 2005 book by John Stillwell

Religion and astrology
Four Pillars of Destiny, a Chinese component used in fortune telling
Four Pillars of Dominican Life, principles of the Dominican Order

See also
Three pillars (disambiguation)
Five pillars (disambiguation)